At the advent of the 20th century, the city of Portland, Oregon, was among the first on the United States West Coast to embrace the advent of the silent and feature film. The city's first movie palace, the Majestic Theatre (later known as the United Artists Theatre), opened in 1911. By 1916, Portland had "the finest array" of movie houses on the West Coast relative to its population, pioneering venues dedicated exclusively to screening films. The popularization of the sound film in the early 1920s resulted in another boom of new cinemas being constructed, including the Laurelhurst, the Hollywood Theatre, and the Bagdad Theatre, the latter of which was financed by Universal Pictures in 1926.

By the mid-20th century, several of the cinemas and movie palaces in Portland were demolished, including the Majestic, the Playhouse Theatre, and the Oriental Theatre. The Portland Publix Theater (later known as the Paramount), is the only cinema in downtown Portland that has survived into the 21st century, having served as the Arlene Schnitzer Concert Hall since 1984.

Since the 1990s, construction of several multiplexes has taken place in the city, mainly by Regal Entertainment Group, who opened multiplex cinemas in the Fox Tower and Pioneer Place in 2000 and 2006, respectively. Several cinemas have also seen extensive renovation since the 1990s, including the Bagdad Theatre by the Portland-based restaurant and hotel company McMenamins, who have opened additional cinemas at their Kennedy School and National Cash Register Building properties. Many of Portland's historic cinemas have continued operations into the 21st century screening both revival and art house films, including the nonprofit Hollywood Theatre, Cinema 21, and the Fifth Avenue Cinema, the latter of which is owned by Portland State University and operated by the university film department. In 2013, the real estate company Movoto ranked Portland the no. 1 city in the United States for movie lovers.

History

1910–1919: Beginnings and silent era

In the early 20th century following the advent of film, Portland, Oregon was one of few western U.S. cities to embrace the exhibition of films. Historians Gary Lacher and Steve Stone partially attribute this to the region's predominant rainy weather, which resulted in residents seeking indoor forms of entertainment.

Though the Star Theater was showing Synchroscope films as early as 1908, the first exclusive movie palace in Portland was the Majestic Theatre located at the northeast corner of Southwest Park Avenue and Washington Street, which opened on June 10, 1911. The venue contained 1,100 seats, and was constructed for $62,500 by Edwin F. James, a businessman from Seattle. It was the first movie palace in Portland to show a silent feature film  the two-reel Italian feature The Fall of Troy  in 1911. The same year, the Majestic introduced a pipe organ to accompany film screenings; the Star Theater also introduced an organ. The Baker Theatre, which had hosted live theater by the Baker Players, began showing films shortly after (the cinema would become known as the Playhouse Theatre in later decades).

The following year, in 1912, the Sunnyside Theatre (contemporarily known as the Avalon Theatre) was opened, followed by the Alhambra and Columbia Theater in 1913. At the time of its opening, the Columbia, built for $125,000, was marketed as being "without peer" as the city's "strictly photo playhouse." Around 1914, construction on the Clinton Street Theater began, and the cinema began showing features in 1915. By 1916, it was reported in The Moving Picture World that Portland had "the finest array of photoplay theaters of any of the cities on the Pacific Coast given its population. This statement is based on the fact that the homes of photodrama in Portland were built for that purpose within recent years and are not rehabilitated broken down theaters that once housed "legit" and burlesque shows."

1920–1949: Sound films

After commercial production of the sound film began in 1923, numerous cinemas were constructed in Portland throughout the remainder of the decade. The Art Deco-inspired Laurelhurst Theater was constructed that year in east Portland, followed by the Roseway Theater in 1924, and the Moreland and Oregon Theatres in 1925 (all in east Portland). In 1926, the Hollywood Theatre was built in the city's the Hollywood District, designed by John V. Bennes, with an exterior resembling Spanish Colonial architecture, and the interior being based on the Baths of Caracalla and Bernini. The Broadway Theatre was also constructed in 1926 in downtown Portland, at 1008 SW Broadway. The exotic Mission Revival-inspired Bagdad Theatre was constructed in 1927 in the city's Hawthorne District, a project funded by Universal Pictures. Other cinemas built in the city in 1927 include the Oriental Theatre and the Aladdin Theater, the latter of which opened on Christmas Day that year.

The lavish Portland Publix Theatre (contemporarily the Arlene Schnitzer Concert Hall) was constructed in downtown in 1928, and featured an unprecedented seat count of over 3,000. Construction of the theater used over 700,000 common bricks and over 350,000 exterior bricks. The construction of the venue cost around $1.4 million, and it opened on March 28, 1928. In 1930, it was recommissioned as the Paramount Theatre, and eventually ceased functions as a cinema, becoming the Arlene Schnitzer Concert Hall in 1984. Contemporarily, it is the last movie palace in downtown Portland to survive into the 21st century.

With the growing popularity of the sound film, some establishments that had earlier functioned as burlesque or vaudeville houses were retrofitted to screen films, including the Fox Theatre (originally an opera and vaudeville venue), which began showing feature films in 1929. The Union Theatre (later known as the Paris Theatre), a burlesque house built in 1922, also began showing films, and became known as the Third Avenue Theatre in 1930. 1948 saw the opening of the 673-seat Academy Theater in Portland's Montavilla neighborhood, one of the few neighborhood cinemas to be built in the city after the 1920s.

1950–1980: Drive-ins and demolitions

Beginning around the 1950s, many cinemas in the city underwent renovations, while others were outright destroyed. The Playhouse Theatre (originally the Baker, and formerly known as the Dufwin, Alcazar, Music Box, and El Capitan in the interim) was closed in June 1950. The building was used for church services before being demolished in 1954. The following year, the Majestic Theatre closed, and was eventually demolished in 1957 to make way for the Union Bank Tower. Three months after the demolition of the Majestic, the People's Theater, a movie house built in 1911 (subsequently named the Alder Theatre and the Music Box in the 1930s), was razed as well. The Oriental Theatre was also demolished several years later in April 1970. In the weeks prior to its demolition, various pieces of furniture and other fixtures from the cinema's interiors were auctioned to locals. The Academy Theater closed in 1977, and was used as a printing facility for the ensuing two decades.

In the 1960s, some of the city's older venues turned toward screening pornographic films, and became adult movie theaters; among these were the Paris Theatre, which screened adult films from 1963 into the 1980s, and the Star Theatre, which operated primarily as an adult theater from the 1960s until 1983. The Oregon Theatre began showing adult films around the 1970s, following the success of Deep Throat (1972).

Drive-in cinemas began to grow in popularity in the late 1940s and throughout the 1960s, and the first in Portlandthe 82nd Street Drive-inwas constructed in 1948. Construction on the Powell Boulevard Drive-in began in southeast Portland in 1954, despite legal protests from neighborhood residents. A third drive-in on the city's east side, the 104th Street Drive-in, was built in 1959. The Foster Drive-in, located on SE Foster Road, was established in 1969. The first multiplex in Portland, the Eastgate Theater, opened in 1966 on SE 82nd Avenue, and featured two screens and state-of-the-art sound. The Fifth Avenue Cinema, located in southwest Portland along the edge of the Portland State University campus, was opened as a Moyer Theater in 1970. After ten years of operation, the cinema was acquired by Portland State, and has been operated by the university film department since. In 1974, the Bagdad underwent renovation, and was divided to contain two separate screens.

1981–2018: Revitalization and multiplexes

In the late 1980s, a multiplex was opened in northeast Portland across the street from the Lloyd Center mall, known as the Lloyd Center 10 and owned by Regal Entertainment Group. Four years later, a second Regal multiplex opened inside the Lloyd Center mall, named the Lloyd Mall 8. Regal also opened the Broadway Metroplex 4 around this time, which occupied the space where the original Broadway Theatre had been prior to its demolition in 1988. Regal subsequently acquired the Division Street Stadium 13, in east Portland (near Gresham), which had opened as an ACT III cinema in 1997. Also starting in the late 1980s, several local cinemas were established and/or renovated by McMenamins, a restaurant, brewery, and hotel company based in Portland. Among these were the Mission Theater and Pub, established in a former church in 1987, and the Bagdad Theatre, which they acquired in 1991. The company also opened small cinemas in the Kennedy School in 1997, and the National Cash Register Building in 1998.

Century Theatres opened the Eastport Plaza 16 in 1998, a multiplex on SE 82nd Avenue near the Eastgate Theater, the latter of which subsequently closed in 2001. The 2000s saw Regal opening an additional two multiplexes in Portland: the Fox Tower Stadium 10 in 2000, which specializes in art house films, and the Pioneer Place Stadium 6. The Academy Theater, which had been closed since 1977, was renovated and reopened as a three-screen cinema in 2006. The Regal Broadway Metroplex was closed in 2011. The sound system for the Broadway Metroplex was salvaged by the Hollywood Theatre, which underwent renovations in 2013.

Since the 2010s, several cinemas in the city also serve craft beers to patrons, including the Hollywood, Laurelhurst, Cinema 21, the Academy, and the Moreland. The Living Room Theaters, a small independent multiplex that opened in 2006, has a full restaurant and bar that serves prepared food to patrons' seats during screenings.

Cinemas
Note: Status refers only to whether or not the venue still screens films; some noted as inactive still function as other types of arts venues.
 indicates building has been demolished or destroyed

Movie houses

Drive-ins

See also
History of Portland, Oregon

References

Sources

External links

Portland cinema history at PDX History

Industry in the United States
Portland
Cinema